The Juno Awards of 1987, representing Canadian music industry achievements of the previous year, were awarded on 2 November 1987 in Toronto at a ceremony in the O'Keefe Centre. Howie Mandel was the host for the ceremonies, which were broadcast on CBC Television.

This was the last year the Juno presentations were held in the latter part of the calendar year. CARAS, which was responsible for the awards, chose to revert to an early-year scheduling, therefore no Junos were awarded 1988 but were rescheduled to March 1989.

Nominees and winners

Canadian Entertainer of the Year
Winner: Bryan Adams

Other Nominees:
 Tom Cochrane & Red Rider
 Bruce Cockburn
 Glass Tiger
 Gowan
 Corey Hart
 k.d. lang
 Anne Murray
 Rock & Hyde
 The Nylons

Female Vocalist of the Year
Winner: Luba (Capitol)

Other Nominees:
 Lee Aaron (Attic)
 Véronique Béliveau (A&M)
 k.d. lang (WEA)
 Anne Murray (Capitol)

Male Vocalist of the Year
Winner: Bryan Adams (A&M)

Other Nominees:
 Corey Hart (Aquarius)
 Gowan (CBS)
 Kim Mitchell (Alert)
 Gino Vannelli (PolyGram)

Most Promising Female Vocalist of the Year
Winner: Rita MacNeil

Other Nominees:
 Heather Bishop (Mother of Pearl)
 Celine Dion (CBS)
 Debbie Johnson
 Nancy Martinez (WEA)

Most Promising Male Vocalist of the Year
Winner: Tim Feehan

Other Nominees:
 David Gibson (A&M)
 Mark Korven (Duke Street)
 Daniel Lavoie (Capitol)
 Christopher Ward (Attic)

Group of the Year
Winner: Tom Cochrane & Red Rider (Capitol)

Other Nominees:
 The Box (Alert)
 The Parachute Club (Current/BMG)
 Rock & Hyde (Capitol)
 Triumph (MCA)

Most Promising Group of the Year
Winner: Frozen Ghost

Other Nominees:
 Eight Seconds (PolyGram)
 Haywire (Attic)
 Nuance (ISBA)
 The Partland Brothers (Capitol)

Composer of the Year
Winner: Jim Vallance

Other Nominees:
 Bryan Adams
 Tom Cochrane
 David Foster
 Bob Rock & Paul Hyde
 Eddie Schwartz

Country Female Vocalist of the Year
Winner: k.d. lang (WEA)

Other Nominees:
 Carroll Baker (Tembo)
 Kelita (BMG)
 Anne Murray (Capitol)
 Sylvia Tyson (Stony Plain)

Country Male Vocalist of the Year
Winner: Ian Tyson (Stony Plain)

Other Nominees:
 Terry Carisse (Savannah)
 Terry Christenson (BMG)
 Gary Fjellgaard (Savannah)
 Ronnie Prophet (BMG)

Country Group or Duo of the Year
Winner: Prairie Oyster (Stony Plain)

Other Nominees:
 Double Eagle (Book Shop Records)
 The Good Brothers (Savannah)
 Anita Perras & Tim Taylor (Savannah)
 Stoker Brothers (BMG)

Instrumental Artist of the Year
Winner: David Foster (WEA)

Other Nominees:
 Liona Boyd (CBS)
 Canadian Brass (CBS)
 Hagood Hardy (Duke Street)
 Frank Mills (Capitol)

Producer of the Year
Winner: Daniel Lanois, So – Peter Gabriel (WEA)

Other Nominees:
 Bryan Adams (Co-producer Bob Clearmountain), "Heat of the Night" – Bryan Adams (A&M)
 Terry Brown (Co-producer Cutting Crew), Broadcast – Cutting Crew (Virgin)
 Bruce Fairbairn, "You Give Love a Bad Name" – Bon Jovi & "Livin' on a Prayer" – Bon Jovi (PolyGram)
 Daniel Lanois (Co-producer Brian Eno), The Joshua Tree – U2 (Island)
 Gino Vannelli / Joe Vannelli / Ross Vannelli, Big Dreamers Never Sleep – Gino Vannelli (PolyGram)
 Chris Wardman, Mending Wall – Chalk Circle (Duke St.)

Recording Engineer of the Year
Winner: Gino Vannelli and Joe Vannelli, "Wild Horses" & "Young Lover" by Gino Vannelli

Other Nominees:
 Peter Lee, "Soul on Ice" & "Heart of Darkness" from No Heroes by Manteca
 John Naslen, "Purple Haze" & "How the Violin" from Shaking the Pumpkin by Hugh Marsh and "Waiting for a Miracle" & "Stolen Land" from Waiting for a Miracle: Singles 1970–1987 by Bruce Cockburn
 Bob Rock, "Wanted Dead or Alive" & "Livin' on a Prayer" from Slippery When Wet by Bon Jovi
 Phil Sheridan, "Ellington" from Mel Tormé / Rob McConnell & The Boss Brass by Rob McConnell & The Boss Brass

Canadian Music Hall of Fame
Winner: The Guess Who

Walt Grealis Special Achievement Award
Winner: Bruce Allen

Nominated and winning albums

Album of the Year
Winner: Shakin' Like a Human Being – Kim Mitchell (Alert)

Other Nominees:
 Between the Earth & Sky – Luba (Capitol)
 Fields of Fire – Corey Hart (Aquarius)
 Great Dirty World – Gowan (CBS)
 Into the Fire – Bryan Adams (A&M)

Best Album Graphics
Winner: Jamie Bennett and Shari Spier, Small Victories by The Parachute Club

Other Nominees:
 Erika Gagnon, Fields of Fire by Corey Hart
 Dale Heslip and Deborah Samuel, Frozen Ghost by Frozen Ghost
 Dale Heslip and Deborah Samuel, Mending Wall by Chalk Circle
 Bart Schoales, Waiting for a Miracle: Singles 1970–1987 by Bruce Cockburn

Best Jazz Album
Winner: If You Could See Me Now – The Oscar Peterson Four (A&M)

Other Nominees:
 Cafe Alto – Dave Turner (CBC Ent.)
 Speak Low, Swing Hard – Oliver Jones Trio (Justin Time)
 Streetniks – The Shuffle Demons (Stubby)
 Trio Jon Ballantyne – Jon Ballantyne (CBC Ent.)

Best Classical Album of the Year
Winner: Schubert, Quintet in C – The Orford String Quartet, Ofra Harnoy (cello) (Fanfare)

Other Nominees:
 Avison/Scarlatti, Concerti Grossi – Tafelmusik Baroque Orchestra (CBC Ent.)
 Great Russian Piano Music – Anton Kuerti (piano) (Fanfare)
 Impact – Beverley Johnston (percussion), James Campbell (clarinet) (Centre-discs)
 Presenting Joaquin Valdepenas – Joaquin Valdepenas (clarinet), Patricia Parr (piano) (CBC Ent.)

Best Classical Album of the Year – Large Ensemble or Soloist(s) With Large Ensemble Accompaniment
Winner: Holst: The Planets – Montreal Symphony Orchestra, Charles Dutoit (conductor) (PolyGram)

Other Nominees:
 Beethoven, Piano Concertos – Toronto Symphony, Anton Kuerti (piano) (CBC Ent.)
 Berlioz: Romeo et Juliette – Montreal Symphony Orchestra, Charles Dutoit (conductor) (PolyGram)
 Stravinsky, The Firebird –  Montreal Symphony Orchestra, Charles Dutoit (conductor) (PolyGram)
 Tchaikovsky: 1812 Overture, Capriccio Italien, March Slave, Nutcracker Suite – Montreal Symphony Orchestra, Charles Dutoit, (conductor) (PolyGram)

Best Children's Album
Winner: Drums! – Bill Usher (Kids')

Other Nominees:
 Bananas in His Eyebrows – Roberta Lynne Stones (Banana)
 Diamond in the Rough – Charlotte Diamond (Hug Bug)
 Family Album – Rick & Judy (Mariposa)
 Family Pie – Kim & Jerry Brodey (Kids')

International Album of the Year
Winner: True Blue – Madonna

Other Nominees:
 Revenge – Eurythmics
 Slippery When Wet – Bon Jovi
 The Joshua Tree – U2
 Top Gun Soundtrack  – Various artists

Nominated and winning releases

Single of the year
Winner: "Someday" – Glass Tiger (Capitol)

Other Nominees:
 "Can't Help Falling in Love" – Corey Hart (Aquarius)
 "Heat of the Night" – Bryan Adams (A&M)
 "Patio Lanterns" – Kim Mitchell (Alert)
 "Vivre dans la nuit" – Nuance (ISBA)

International Single of the Year
Winner: "Venus" – Bananarama

Other Nominees:
 "Papa Don't Preach"  by Madonna
 "Rumours" by Timex Social Club
 "The Lady in Red" by Chris de Burgh
 "Touch Me (I Want Your Body)" by Samantha Fox

Best Classical Composition
Winners:
 Atayoskewin – Malcolm Forsyth (composer), Edmonton Symphony Orchestra, Uri Mayer (conductor), (CBC Ent.)
 Pages of Solitary Delights – Donald Steven (composer), Maureen Forrester with the McGill Symphony Orchestra, Richard Hoenich (conductor), (McGill University Records)

Other Nominees:
 Cadenzas – Impact, Alexina Louie (composer) (Centrediscs)
 Overture to a Fairy Tale – Canadian & Russian Overtures, Oskar Morawetz (composer) (CBC Ent.)
 Scherzo For String Orchestra – Entre Amis, Andre Prevost (composer) (CBC Ent.)

Best R&B/Soul Recording of the Year
Winner: Peek-A-Boo – Kim Richardson (A&M)

Other Nominees:
 Big City – Glen Ricketts (Seraff)
 Dream Girl – George Olliver (Slott)
 For The Love of Money – Erroll Starr (A&M)
 Here And Now – Tchukon (Aquarius)

Best Reggae/Calypso Recording
Winner: Mean While – Leroy Sibbles (Attic)

Other Nominees:
 Chant, Chant – Errol Blackwood (Jahmaker)
 Crazy – Messenjah (Version)
 Empty Promises – Adrian Miller (Bridge)
 Live Via Sattalites – Sattalites (Axe)

Best Video
Winner: Ron Berti, "Love Is Fire" – The Parachute Club (Current/BMG)

Other Nominees:
 Ron Berti, "Waiting for a Miracle" – Bruce Cockburn (True North)
 Mark Gane & Martha Johnson, "Only You" – M+M (Current/BMG)
 Nelu Ghiran, "I'm an Adult Now" – The Pursuit of Happiness (Swell)
 Stephen Surjik, "Should I See" – Frozen Ghost (WEA)
 Rob Quartly, "Easy to Tame" – Kim Mitchell (Alert)

References

External links
Juno Awards official site

1987
1987 music awards
1987 in Canadian music